Ivo de Vieuxpont (died 1239), Lord of Alston Moor, Sorbie and Cuverville, was an Anglo-Norman noble.

He was a son of William de Vieuxpont and Maud de Morville. Ivo supported John, King of England. Known as one of the counsellors of John, he was appointed governor of Mountsorrel castle. Ivo was identified as an enemy of Henry III of England, and his lands in Northamptonshire given to his brother Robert de Vieuxpont.

Marriage and issue
Ivo married Isabel, daughter of William de Lancaster and Helwise de Stuteville, they are known to have had the following issue:
Robert de Vieuxpont, Lord of Cuverville, married Marie de sainte Beuve, without issue.
Lawrence de Vieuxpont
Nicholas de Vieuxpont, Lord of Alston Moor.
Joan de Vieuxpont
Jane de Vieuxpont

He married secondly Sybilia, daughter of Bernard de Thoresby, with no issue.

References

Year of birth unknown
Anglo-Normans
History of Northamptonshire
History of Cumbria
Galloway
Calvados (department)
John, King of England
1239 deaths
People from Alston Moor